The Savoia-Pomilio SP.1 was a reconnaissance and bomber aircraft built in Italy during the First World War.

Design and development
The SP.1 was designed by Major Umberto Savoia and Lieutenant Ottorino Pomilio based on the Farman MF.11 that SIA was building under licence as the SIA 5b. While the SP.1 shared the same basic configuration as the 5b, it was a larger and stronger aircraft. 

The pilot and observer sat in tandem in an open nacelle with the engine mounted pusher-fashion at its rear. This nacelle was mounted on struts in the gap between biplane wings, and a twin-tail arrangement linked by a common horizontal stabiliser was carried on booms that extended aft from the wings. SIA built the prototype at its factory in Turin, and while this was the only example constructed, it served as the basis for a number of follow-on designs, the SP.2, SP.3, and SP.4, which were built in large numbers.

Specifications

Notes

References
 
 
 

Savoia-Pomilio aircraft
1910s Italian military reconnaissance aircraft
1910s Italian bomber aircraft
Biplanes
Aircraft first flown in 1916